The New England Mutual Life Insurance Building, near Boston's Copley Square, was begun in 1939 and opened 1941.  
David McCord wrote:

References

Office buildings in Boston
Commercial buildings completed in 1941